Datuk James Wong (born 26 June 1953) is a former Malaysian footballer who is a striker for Malaysian national football team and Sabah. He also played as a goalkeeper for the Malaysia youth team in the 1971 AFC Youth Championship. He was known as King James by the local fans.

Career Overview 
Wong was the first Sabahan to represent Malaysia in 1971. In 1974, He went Down Under to joinHakoah Sydney, the Australian club, at the invitation of former Malaysian head coach, Dave MacLaren. He played professionally for the club in New South Wales Premier League for two years. Wong is well-known for his physical and finishing touch. His partnership with Hassan Sani produced many memorable goals for Sabah and Malaysia. The most memorable one was in the 1980 Olympic games qualification. In the qualification, Malaysia won the play-off against South Korea with a 2–1 score at the Merdeka Stadium. Wong himself scored the winning goal off a pass from Hassan. Unfortunately, Malaysia did not participate after joining the US-led boycott against the Soviet Union for its role in supporting the Democratic Republic of Afghanistan against the Islamic Unity of Afghanistan Mujahideen. Wong also appeared for Malaysia in six qualifying matches of the FIFA World Cup.

Honours

Club
Sabah Youth
Burnley Cup: 1969

Sabah
 Malaysian League Tournament runner-up: 1979

 Borneo Cup: 1970, 1971, 1972, 1977, 1978, 1979, 1980

International 
 SEA Games: 1977, 1979

 King's Cup: 1976

Individual 
 Borneo Cup top scorer: 1970, 1972, 1977, 1980

 National Day Award - Outstanding achievement of all time: 2012

 Goal.com The best Malaysia XI of all time: 2020

Orders 
  :
  Commander of the Order of Kinabalu (PGDK) – Datuk (2016)

Further career 
In 2015, he together with Hassan was appointed as one of the members for the management team of Sabah FA.

References 

1953 births
Living people
Malaysian footballers
Malaysian people of Hakka descent
Malaysia international footballers
Malaysian expatriate footballers
Association football forwards
Association football goalkeepers
People from Sabah
Sabah F.C. (Malaysia) players
Sabah F.C. (Malaysia) managers
Malaysian sportspeople of Chinese descent
People from Kota Kinabalu
Southeast Asian Games gold medalists for Malaysia
Southeast Asian Games medalists in football
Competitors at the 1977 Southeast Asian Games